Medal of Honor is a soundtrack album of Ramin Djawadi from the 2010 first-person shooter video game Medal of Honor.
The first official single from the soundtrack was Linkin Park's song "The Catalyst", which was used to promote the game. An extended version of the soundtrack was released in the Medal of Honor Soundtrack Collection, which contains all of the music in the Medal of Honor franchise released up to that point and was released on March 1, 2011.

Background 

The music for Medal of Honor was composed by Ramin Djawadi.

Release 
The official soundtrack was released on September 28, 2010, on iTunes and Amazon, nearly half a month before the release of the game. The soundtrack consists of 20 tracks, including multiple variations of "The Catalyst". The song was also released as a promotional single for the soundtrack. A separate video of the song was published, which featured the scenes from the game.

Themes from the previous game reappear as well, in slightly altered form. An insert featuring promotional artwork was included with retail copies of Battlefield 3, featuring little more than a picture and a BBFC logo. On February 23, 2012, Medal of Honor: Warfighter was officially unveiled, alongside promotional artwork. Reception to the sequel was mixed to overwhelmingly negative.

Track listing

References

External links 
 

Medal of Honor (video game series)
Linkin Park
2010 soundtrack albums
Video game soundtracks
Ramin Djawadi soundtracks